Mulibrey nanism ("MUscle-LIver-BRain-EYe nanism")  is a rare autosomal recessive congenital disorder. It causes severe growth failure along with abnormalities of the heart, muscle, liver, brain and eye. TRIM37 is responsible for various cellular functions including developmental patterning.

Signs/symptoms
An individual with Mulibrey nanism has growth retardation, a short broad neck, misshapen sternum, small thorax, square shoulders, enlarged liver, and yellowish dots in the ocular fundi. Individuals with Mulibrey nanism have also been reported to have intellectual disability, tumors, and infertility.

Genetics 
 
Mulibrey nanism is caused by mutations of the TRIM37 gene, located at human chromosome 17q22-23. The disorder is inherited in an autosomal recessive manner. This means the defective gene responsible for the disorder is located on an autosome (chromosome 17 is an autosome), and two copies of the defective gene (one inherited from each parent) are required in order to be born with the disorder. The parents of an individual with an autosomal recessive disorder both carry one copy of the defective gene, but usually do not experience any symptoms of the disorder.

Diagnosis
The diagnosis of Mulibrey nanism can be done via genetic testing, as well as by the physical characteristics (signs/symptoms) displayed by the individual.

Treatment

In terms of treatment/management for those with Mulibrey nanism should have routine medical follow-ups, additionally the following can be done:
 Growth hormone treatment
 Regular pelvic exams
 Pericardiectomy

Prevalence
Worldwide, it has been documented in 110 persons, 85 of them Finnish.  It is a recessive genetic disease. Many people with Mulibrey nanism have parents who are closely related, consanguine.  Signs and symptoms are variable: siblings who suffer this disease sometimes do not share the same symptoms.

See also
 Wilms' tumour

References

Further reading

External links 

Autosomal recessive disorders
Congenital disorders
Rare diseases